Lesia Tsurenko was the defending champion, but lost in the first round to Sorana Cîrstea.

Çağla Büyükakçay won her first WTA title, defeating Danka Kovinić in the final, 3–6, 6–2, 6–3.

Seeds

Draw

Finals

Top half

Bottom half

Qualifying

Seeds

Qualifiers

Draw

First qualifier

Second qualifier

Third qualifier

Fourth qualifier

Fifth qualifier

Sixth qualifier

References
 Main Draw
 Qualifying Draw

2016 in Istanbul
2016 in Turkish tennis
Istanbul Cup - Singles
İstanbul Cup
İstanbul Cup